Mesolia baboquivariella is a moth in the family Crambidae. It was described by William D. Kearfott in 1907. It is found in the US state of Arizona.

References

Ancylolomiini
Moths described in 1907